Richmond High School, (abbreviated as RHS) is a government-funded co-educational comprehensive secondary day school, located on Lennox Street, Richmond, in the Hawkesbury River region of New South Wales, Australia.

Established in 1955, the school caters for approximately 750 students from Year 7 to Year 12. The school is operated by the New South Wales Department of Education.

History
The school was established in January 1955. The motto is a translation of a phrase taken from the Book of Proverbs, chapter 23, verse 7.

Alumni

 Allan G. Bromleyhistorian of computing
 Dave Dennisrugby union player; NSW Waratahs captain; Australian Wallabies
 Ashton Irwindrummer of pop-rock band 5 Seconds of Summer
 Stephen O'Keefecricket player; NSW and Sydney 6ers all-rounder
 Kevin Rozzolipolitician; Speaker of the New South Wales Legislative Assembly 1988–1995

See also 

 List of government schools in New South Wales
 Education in Australia

References

External links 
 Richmond High School website

Public high schools in Sydney
Educational institutions established in 1955
1955 establishments in Australia
Richmond, New South Wales